Osborn Wyddel the Irishman, (fl. 1280), was founder of the houses of Cors y gedol, Wynne of Ynys maengwyn, Wynne of Maes y neuadd, and other important families in Merionethshire.

Life
He was an Irishman with some Welsh ancestry, potentially arriving in Wales during the year 1237. he settled in the neighbourhood of Llanaber, Barmouth, in the latter part of the thirteenth century. Tradition, the only authority for his career, asserts that he was a Geraldine, of the Desmond branch of that family. On this assumption Sir William Betham, Ulster king of arms, thought he was in all probability a son of John FitzThomas, the first Geraldine lord of Decies and Desmond (d. 1261).

The circumstances of his settlement in Ardudwy (North-west Merionethshire) are unknown, though it may be conjectured that he was driven to seek a home in Wales by the temporary overthrow of the Geraldine influence in Desmond which followed the Battle of Callan (1261). A spot called Berllys (or Byrllysg), a little to the north of Cors y gedol, is pointed out as the site of Osborn's first residence.

He afterwards married, it is said, the heiress of Cors y gedol in west Merioneth, and had a son name 'Kenric Ab Osbwrn', who became the ancestor of some of the local landed gentry such as Wynne family of Glyncywarch, Wynne family of Peniarth, Vaughan family of Corsygedol. He was assessed in the parish of Llanaber for the fifteenth levied in 1293 or 1294 upon holders of land in Wales, and was probably responsible for the building of Llanaber church

Ancestry
Genealogists have noted with certainty that Osbwrn's ancestry was to have descended through numerous Irish Fitz families of Norman-Irish descent; starting with Roger de Montgomery a Norman Knight who fought in the Battle of Hastings, himself a descendant of Danish and Swedish royalty. Then it's speculated that Roger's descendant, Walter FitzOther married Gladys ap Conwym the daughter of a Welsh Prince. The Norman-Irish families continued to establish themselves after the Norman invasion; the 1st Lord of Offaly was established as the ancestor of the Duke's of Leinster in Dublin, Osbwrn's father has been noted as John FitzThomas, 1st Baron Desmond a man who he fought alongside at the battle of Callann. John FitzThomas's great-grandmother is noted as being Nest ferch Rhys, daughter Rhys ap Tewdwr the last king of Deheubarth.

References

Sources

Archaeologia Cambrensis, 3rd ser. iv, 315, ix. 66-9

Attribution

13th-century Irish people